Margaret Irene Strickland (born May 24, 1980) is an American attorney and jurist serving as a United States district judge of the United States District Court for the District of New Mexico.

Education 

Strickland received a Bachelor of Arts degree from the University of Texas at El Paso in 2003 and a Juris Doctor from New York University School of Law in 2006.

Career 

She started her career at the law offices of the New Mexico Public Defender from 2006 to 2011. From 2011 to 2021, she was a partner at McGraw & Strickland LLC in Las Cruces, New Mexico. From 2017 to 2019, she served as president of the New Mexico Criminal Defense Lawyers Association.

Notable cases 

Strickland represented Jillian and Andrew Beck who successfully sued two Las Cruces police officers over allegations of brutality and civil rights violations. The couple was awarded $1.4 million.

Federal judicial service 
On March 30, 2021, President Joe Biden announced his intent to nominate Strickland to serve as a United States district judge for the United States District Court for the District of New Mexico. On April 19, 2021, her nomination was sent to the Senate. President Biden nominated Strickland to the seat vacated by Judge Robert C. Brack, who assumed senior status on July 25, 2018. On May 26, 2021, a hearing on her nomination was held before the Senate Judiciary Committee. On June 24, 2021, her nomination was reported out of committee on by a 12–10 vote. On September 21, 2021, the United States Senate invoked cloture on her nomination by a 52–46 vote. Her nomination was confirmed later that day by a 52–45 vote. She received her judicial commission on October 22, 2021.

References

External links 

1980 births
Living people
21st-century American women lawyers
21st-century American judges
21st-century American lawyers
21st-century American women judges
Criminal defense lawyers
Judges of the United States District Court for the District of New Mexico
New Mexico lawyers
New York University School of Law alumni
People from Denton, Texas
Public defenders
United States district court judges appointed by Joe Biden
University of Texas at El Paso alumni